Mališan (pennant number: P-901) was a CB-class midget submarine in service with the Yugoslav Navy (JRM). Mališan was laid down in 1943 as CB-20 for the Regia Marina (Royal Navy). Following the Italian Armistice in September 1943, the unfinished boat was captured by the Germans who handed it to the Navy of the Italian Social Republic. The boat was captured by Yugoslav Partisans in Pula in 1945 and commissioned in the JRM shortly after the war.

The boat was decommissioned at some point in the 1950s after a brief service life. In 1959, it was handed over to the Technical Museum in Zagreb, where it has been on display ever since. Beginning in 2008, Mališan underwent restoration of its interior and exterior which included returning its original Italian paint scheme and designation.

Design and building 

Mališan was laid down in 1943 by Caproni, Milan as CB-20 for service in the Regia Marina. The boat measures  in length, with a  beam and a  draught. Underwater it displaced  compared to  when surfaced. The boat's complement during wartime was made of four crew members, one officer and three seamen, while during peacetime the boat could have been operated by a crew of just two. Armament consisted of two  external torpedo tubes located on the sides of the hull.

Propulsion consisted of a  Isotta Fraschini D 80 diesel engine and a  Marelli Motore Corrente Contina MG 754 S electric motor, mounted on a single shaft. Maximum speed was  surfaced and  when underwater.

Service history 
After the Kingdom of Italy surrendered to the Allies on 3 September 1943, the unfinished CB-20 was captured by German forces and completed by March 1944. The boat was then handed over to the Italian Social Republic where it saw service with the Tenth Flotilla performing reconnaissance and landing saboteurs. At some point between September and October 1944, CB-20 was relocated to its new home port in Pula, where it was captured by the Partisans on 3 May 1945. Renamed Mališan (P-901), translating as nipper in English, the boat was overhauled at the Uljanik Shipyard and commissioned in 1948. The Yugoslav Navy used it for training new submariners as well as evaluating the concept of midget submarines for future use, which eventually materialized in the form of the Una-class midget submarines three decades later. Depending on the source, the exact time Mališan was decommissioned differs from the early 1950s to 1957.

Aftermath 

In 1959, the boat was donated to the Technical Museum in Zagreb, where it has remained since. It the only known preserved boat of its class. In 2007, the museum decided to restore the boat, which was beginning to show signs of deterioration. Work started in 2008, and was focused on restoring the interior by dismantling all removable parts from the command section and the engine room. The removed parts were preserved and restored with a detailed documentation about their state before and after restoration.

Work on the exterior began in 2009; the tail section with the propeller and the torpedo tubes were dismantled and restored. Work on the exterior also included the restoration of the boat's original Italian paint scheme and name in favor of its later Yugoslav service. Although the decision was questioned by some, the changes were allegedly carried out because of "greater historical relevance" and a "more reliably documented history under its original name and flag". The fully restored boat was reopened for the public in early April 2010.

See also 
List of ships of the Yugoslav Navy

Notes

References 
Books

Other sources

1944 ships
Ships built in Italy
Caproni
Naval ships of Italy captured by Germany during World War II
Ships of the Yugoslav Navy
World War II submarines of Italy
Midget submarines
Museum ships in Croatia
Ships preserved in museums